This is a list of music organizations in the United States. It does not include symphony orchestras or other performance groups, or educational and research institutions unless they have significant programs outside the fields of education, research or performance. It does include corporations or record labels.

Generally, only currently extant organizations are included. Some historically significant but defunct groups may also be included.

International organizations are only included if they do have an American affiliate, and do have a major focus on American music.

References 

 The Garland Encyclopedia of World Music: Volume 3: United States and Canada. Ellen Koskoff (ed.). Garland Publishing Inc. New York and London. 2001.

Notes 

Organizations in the United States

United States